The 2014–15 season was Kilmarnock's second season in the Scottish Premiership. They also competed in the League Cup and the Scottish Cup.

Overview
Kilmarnock finished tenth in the Scottish Premiership with 41 points. They reached the third round of the League Cup, losing to St. Johnstone, and the fourth round of the Scottish Cup, losing to Rangers. Allan Johnston resigned from his position as manager in February 2015 after informing the press of his intention to leave at the end of the season, with his assistant Gary Locke taking temporary charge before being installed full-time in April.

Match results

Pre-season and friendlies

Scottish Premiership

Scottish Cup

Scottish League Cup

Club statistics

Competition Overview

League table

Squad statistics

Source:

Player transfers

Transfers in

Transfers out

References

2014–15
Kilmarnock